The CEV qualification for the 2014 FIVB Volleyball Men's World Championship saw member nations compete for eight places at the finals in Poland. The two best-ranked teams from the 2013 Men's European Volleyball Championship, plus six teams from the qualification tournaments qualified for the World Championship.

2013 European Championship

Venues:  and 
Dates: 20–29 September 2013

 Eliminated in third qualification round

 
 
 

 Eliminated in second qualification round

 
 
 
 
 
 
 
 
 
 
 
 

 Eliminated in first qualification round

Draw
40 CEV national teams entered qualification. The teams were distributed according to their position in the CEV Senior Men's Confederation Rankings as of 1 January 2013 using the serpentine system for their distribution. (Rankings shown in brackets) Pools composition was determined by taking into consideration – as far as possible – the geographical location of the various countries. Teams ranked 1–12 do not compete in the first and second rounds, and automatically qualify for the third round. (Russia seed 2 and Italy seed 5, later qualified through European Championship)

First round

Second round

Third round

The twenty remaining teams were distributed according to their position in the CEV Senior Men's Confederation Rankings as of 1 January 2013 using the serpentine system for their distribution. (Rankings shown in brackets)

First round

Pool A
Venue:  Dom odbojke Bojan Stranić, Zagreb, Croatia
Dates: 24–26 May 2013
All times are Central European Summer Time (UTC+02:00).

|}

|}

Pool B
Venue:  Arena Stožice, Ljubljana, Slovenia
Dates: 24–26 May 2013
All times are Central European Summer Time (UTC+02:00).

|}

|}

Pool C
Venue:  Rakvere Spordihall, Rakvere, Estonia
Dates: 24–26 May 2013
All times are Eastern European Summer Time (UTC+03:00).

|}

|}

Pool D
Venue:  Sportcampus Lange Munte, Kortrijk, Belgium
Dates: 23–26 May 2013
All times are Central European Summer Time (UTC+02:00).

|}

|}

Pool E
Venue:  Halmstad Arena, Halmstad, Sweden
Dates: 24–26 May 2013
All times are Central European Summer Time (UTC+02:00).

|}

|}

Pool F
Venue:  SRC Kale, Skopje, Macedonia
Dates: 24–26 May 2013
All times are Central European Summer Time (UTC+02:00).

|}

|}

Pool G
Venue:  Spyros Kyprianou Athletic Center, Limassol, Cyprus
Dates: 6–8 June 2013
All times are Eastern European Summer Time (UTC+03:00).

|}

|}

Second round

Pool H
Venue:  Topsportcentrum, Almere, Netherlands
Dates: 2–6 October 2013
All times are Central European Summer Time (UTC+02:00).

|}

|}

Third round

Pool I
Venue:  Opava Sports Hall, Opava, Czech Republic
Dates: 3–5 January 2014
All times are Central European Time (UTC+01:00).

|}

|}

Pool J
Venue:  Čair Sports Center, Niš, Serbia
Dates: 3–5 January 2014
All times are Central European Time (UTC+01:00).

|}

|}

Pool K
Venue:  MHP Arena, Ludwigsburg, Germany
Dates: 3–5 January 2014
All times are Central European Time (UTC+01:00).

|}

|}

Pool L
Venue:  Halle Georges Carpentier, Paris, France
Dates: 3–5 January 2014
All times are Central European Time (UTC+01:00).

|}

|}

Pool M
Venue:  Aréna Poprad, Poprad, Slovakia
Dates: 3–5 January 2014
All times are Central European Time (UTC+01:00).

|}

|}

Second placed teams

|}

References

External links
Official website

2014 FIVB Volleyball Men's World Championship
2013 in volleyball
2014 in volleyball